The Emblem of Lakshadweep is the symbol used to represent the administration of the union territory of Lakshadweep, India.

Design
The emblem depicts an Ashoka Chakra behind which there is a palm tree which is flanked by two butterflyfish and below is a compartment of ribbons in the colours of the Indian flag.

Government banner
The administration of Lakshadweep can be represented by a banner displaying the emblem of the territory on a white field.

See also

 National Emblem of India
 List of Indian state emblems

References

Lakshadweep
Lakshadweep
Lakshadweep